Bugs Bunny & Lola Bunny: Operation Carrot Patch,  is a 1998 Game Boy Color video game starring Bugs Bunny and Lola Bunny.

Plot
Yosemite Sam, Daffy Duck, The Tasmanian Devil, Marvin the Martian and Elmer Fudd have stolen Bugs and Lola's carrots and hid them in different sets in the nearby studio. Bugs and Lola head through five different "sets" in order to reclaim them.

Gameplay
In the game, Bugs and Lola (the player can switch between them at any time) can traverse two levels during the set, collecting carrots. Both Bugs and Lola have the ability to jump and hit enemies with a hammer. Bugs is able to push items and dig underground, whilst Lola can slowly descend from heights using her umbrella. Collecting carrots enables Bugs/Lola to run in the air to gain more height with each jump. In addition, other special carrots allow the rabbits to fly using their ears for a short time, or gain invincibility. To pass a stage, four pieces of a clapboard must be found.

The last level of each set sees the boss for the respective level chasing after Bugs, who must make it to the end of the level without falling victim to the various hazards in the way. Once the end of the level is reached, the boss will confront Bugs directly, and he must be beaten in order to progress. If the player collects all the letters “Extra” off of Tweety in a level, Bugs or Lola can play a mini-game after clearing the level.

Reception
Game review aggregation website GameRankings gave it a rating of 76.00% based on 3 reviews. IGN gave it 8/10.French gaming website Jeuxvideo.com gave it 17/20.

References

Notes

External links
MobyGames page

1998 video games
Infogrames games
Game Boy Color games
Game Boy Color-only games
Video games featuring Bugs Bunny
Video games featuring Daffy Duck
Video games featuring the Tasmanian Devil (Looney Tunes)
Video games featuring female protagonists
Video games scored by Alberto Jose González
Video games developed in France
Warner Bros. video games